SubStance: A Review of Theory and Literary Criticism is a triannual peer-reviewed academic journal that was established in 1971 and is published by the Johns Hopkins University Press. It covers work on literature and culture, with an emphasis on French literature. The editors-in-chief are Sydney Lévy (University of California, Santa Barbara) and Michel Pierssens (Université de Montréal).

Abstracting and indexing 
The journal is abstracted and indexed in:
Arts and Humanities Citation Index
Current Contents/Arts and Humanities
MLA International Bibliography
Scopus

References

External links 
 

Cultural journals
Publications established in 1971
English-language journals
Triannual journals
University of Wisconsin–Madison